Wang Zhuo (born 16 January 1990) is a Chinese footballer who currently plays for Zibo Cuju in China League One.

Club career
Wang Zhuo would play for lower league clubs Liaoning Tiger and Fushun Xinye before joining Guizhou Hengfeng where he was part of the team that won the 2012 China League Two division. The following season he was promoted as the clubs first choice goalkeeper, however the club performed poorly within the 2013 China League One campaigned where they were relegated at the end of the season and Wang was singled out for criticism by the fans on social media for his weight, which stood at 108 kilograms. Su Boyang would be brought in as Guizhou's first choice goalkeeper the next season while Wang significantly lost weight and aided the club to gain successive promotions to the Chinese top tier. On 17 June 2017, Wang would make his Chinese Super League debut against Guangzhou Evergrande that ended in a 2–0 defeat.

Career statistics
.

Honours

Club
Guizhou Hengfeng
China League Two: 2012

References

External links
 

1990 births
Living people
Chinese footballers
Association football goalkeepers
China League Two players
China League One players
Chinese Super League players
Guizhou F.C. players